FC Ameri Tbilisi was a Georgian football club based in the district of Gldani in Tbilisi. The club was founded in 2002 and was dissolved in 2009 after a financial troubles.

Ameri won promotion for the Second Division after the 2002–03 season. In 2003/04 they finished 12th out of 16 and were to be relegated, but were saved after withdrawal of two teams. In 2004/05 they became the champions of the Second Division, winning promotion to Umaglesi Liga. In 2005/06 they finished seventh in the league, but won the Georgian Cup. This allowed them to enter the UEFA Cup.

European record

Achievements
Georgian Cup
 Winners: 2005–06, 2006–07
Georgian Super Cup
 Winners: 2006, 2007

External links
 Official website (archived on March 28, 2007)

Ameri Tbilisi
Association football clubs established in 2002
Association football clubs disestablished in 2009
Ameri Tbilisi
2002 establishments in Georgia (country)
2009 disestablishments in Georgia (country)